China-Pakistan Power Plant Corporation is an energy contractor established by China China and Pakistan to manage the on-site operations of the Chashma Nuclear Power Plant   and to build nuclear power plants in Pakistan and China. 

Pakistan has shortage of electricity resulting in periodic blackouts all over the country. These nuclear plants will help alleviate power shortage in expanding economy. This will help Pakistan’s nuclear energy requirements of 8,800 megawatts by 2030 by expediting the delivery of six nuclear power plants of 300MW each.  Earlier, China had assisted Pakistan in setting up the Chashma Nuclear Power Plant with Chashma-1 and Chashma-2 units of the same capacity.

See also 

 Pakistan Atomic Energy Commission

References

"Nuclear Power in the Middle East" by Nick, Cypro, Washington University Press, 2001

Nuclear power in Pakistan
China–Pakistan relations
Pakistan Atomic Energy Commission